The Aotearoa Student Press Association is an association of eight student newspapers and magazines that are published by the student associations of universities and polytechnics in Aotearoa (New Zealand). The Aotearoa Student Press Association has an associate membership in the New Zealand House of Representatives press gallery.

Membership 
Members of the Aotearoa Student Press Association are:

Canta, University of Canterbury
Craccum, University of Auckland
Critic Te Arohi, University of Otago
Debate, Auckland University of Technology
Massive, Massey University (Wellington, Albany and Manawatu campuses)
Nexus, Waikato University
Salient, Victoria University of Wellington
Te Pararē, Te Mana Ākonga

Magazines that are no longer part of the Aotearoa Student Press Association include:

Ram, Lincoln University
Crew, Universal College of Learning
Decoy, Eastern Institute of Technology
Gyro, Otago Polytechnic
In Unison, Unitec

Awards 
The association has held an annual awards ceremony since 2002, recognising the best in New Zealand's student media; past sponsors have included the New Zealand Listener and Fairfax Media Group. Prizes regularly include subscriptions and an internship with the sponsor. The awards are judged by a collection of New Zealand media experts and commentators - previous judges have included Chris Knox, Nicky Hager, Raybon Kan, and John Campbell.

Past Award Recipients 

Best Publication

2022 - Craccum

2021 - Critic Te Arohi.

2020 - Critic Te Arohi.

2019 - Critic Te Arohi.

2018 - Critic Te Arohi.

2017 - Critic Te Arohi.

2016 -

2015 -

2014 - Critic Te Arohi, Canta and Nexus (joint 2nd)

2013 - Critic Te Arohi, Salient (2nd), Massive (3rd)

2012 - Critic Te Arohi, Salient (2nd), Massive (3rd)

2011 - Salient, Magneto and Critic Te Arohi (joint 2nd)

2010 - Critic Te Arohi, Salient (2nd), Canta (3rd)

2009 - Salient, Craccum (2nd), Critic Te Arohi (3rd)

2008 - Critic Te Arohi, Magneto (2nd), Salient (3rd)

2007 - Craccum, Critic Te Arohi (2nd), Salient (3rd)

2006 - Critic Te Arohi, Salient (2nd), Craccum (3rd)

2005 - Critic Te Arohi, Salient (2nd), Craccum (3rd)

2004 - Salient, Critic Te Arohi (2nd), Craccum (3rd)

Best Small Publication

2013 -  Canta

2012 -  Canta, Nexus (2nd)

2009 - Magneto, Gyro (2nd), InUnison (3rd)

2007 - Magneto, In Unison (2nd), Satellite (3rd)

2006 - Magneto, Satellite (2nd), In Unison (3rd)

2005 - Debate, Magneto (2nd), Satellite & In Unison (3rd equal)

References

External links
New Zealand House of Representatives: Press Gallery members

 
Students' associations in New Zealand